Park Yo-Seb (born December 3, 1980) is a South Korean football player who has played for FC Seoul, Gwangju Sangmu FC (Military service), Gangneung City FC in South Korea.

He is now plying his trade with Singaporean side, Tampines Rovers FC in the S-League after his move to the Super Reds failed to materialised when the latter failed to gain admission into the S-League 2010.

Club career statistics

External links
 
  Park Yo-seb - National League stats at Korea National League 
 Park Yo-seb – National Team stats at KFA 
 
 

1980 births
Living people
Association football defenders
South Korean footballers
South Korean expatriate footballers
South Korea international footballers
FC Seoul players
FC Seoul non-playing staff
Gimcheon Sangmu FC players
Gangneung City FC players
Tampines Rovers FC players
K League 1 players
Korea National League players
Singapore Premier League players
People from Suncheon
2004 AFC Asian Cup players
Expatriate footballers in Singapore
South Korean expatriate sportspeople in Singapore
Asian Games medalists in football
Footballers at the 2002 Asian Games
Asian Games bronze medalists for South Korea
Medalists at the 2002 Asian Games
Sportspeople from South Jeolla Province